Sajeewa Weerakoon (born 17 February 1978), is a former Sri Lankan One Day International cricketer. He is a slow left-arm orthodox bowler.

Domestic career
He has played for Burgher Recreation Club and Galle Cricket Club in domestic cricket. He made his Twenty20 debut on 17 August 2004, for Burgher Recreation Club in the 2004 SLC Twenty20 Tournament.

After consistently performing for Sri Lanka A he was included in the national squad to tour India in 2005. Although he didn't play a Test it was recognition for a wonderful season which included 60 wickets for Sri Lanka A in just seven First-class matches. Before his selection in the Sri Lankan squad he had won the best bowler award twice in domestic cricket, topping 50 wickets on both occasions in the Premier league. A left-arm orthodox spin bowler, Weerakoon has taken over 800 wickets in first-class cricket.

Sajeewa played as club professional for Wood Lane CC of the North Staffs & South Cheshire Premier League in 2007 when he finished as joint leading wicket taker in the League.

International career
Though he has good record in domestic arena, he could not prove his worthiness to international team. He made his ODI debut against Pakistan in 2012 at Colombo.

References

External links

Sri Lankan cricketers
Sri Lanka One Day International cricketers
Galle Cricket Club cricketers
Tamil Union Cricket and Athletic Club cricketers
Burgher Recreation Club cricketers
Colts Cricket Club cricketers
Ruhuna cricketers
Ragama Cricket Club cricketers
Basnahira cricketers
Victoria Sporting Club cricketers
Cricketers from Galle
1978 births
Living people
Cricketers at the 2010 Asian Games
Asian Games competitors for Sri Lanka